Scarlett's Magic is a leopard-printed Savannah cat, acclaimed by the Guinness World Records as the former world's tallest living domestic cat. (The record has since been broken by Arcturus Aldebaran Powers who stands 19.1 inches tall). She first achieved this record in 2009 when she measured 41.87 centimeters or 16.49 inches from shoulder to toe. One year later, she broke her own record by growing over one additional inch, measuring 45.9 centimeters or 18.07 inches from shoulder to toe. Her international achievement can be seen on page 155 in the 2011 Guinness Book. 

In 2010, Scarlett's Magic was also awarded a second Guinness World Record for longest, living, domestic cat (feline) at 108.51 centimeters or 42.72 inches in length and is the first animal to simultaneously hold two Guinness World Records.

Biography
Scarlett's Magic is a Savannah cat, born on March 6, 2008. She is owned by and lives with Marty and Matteo Draper as their pet. Her sweet temperament and unusual appearance make her a celebrity at local schools, libraries, retirement homes, and at the Savannah Cat Shoppe in Southern California.

Corona
March 12, 2010: Scarlett's Magic, a Savannah cat owned by the Draper family Leon S. Draper, Kimberly Saunders, Martin "Marty" Draper and Matthew "Matteo" Draper was awarded the key to the city of Corona for being recognized in the 2011 Guinness Book of World Records as the World's Tallest Cat, measuring 45.9 centimeters (18.1 inches) from shoulder to toe.

Recognition
On March 12, 2010, Scarlett's Magic was awarded the "Key to the City" of Corona, California for her role in the local community and recognition by the Guinness World Records. She has also made several national television appearances including on Live with Regis and Kelly and Animal Planet.

See also
 List of individual cats

References

External links
 Official website, as archived February 1, 2020
 
2008 animal births
Individual cats in the United States